Kijevac may refer to the following places in Serbia:

 Kijevac (Babušnica)
 Kijevac (Surdulica)